Vong Lu Veng (born 12 March 1950) is a Hong Kong table tennis player. He competed in the men's singles and the men's doubles events at the 1988 Summer Olympics.

References

External links
 

1950 births
Living people
Hong Kong male table tennis players
Olympic table tennis players of Hong Kong
Table tennis players at the 1988 Summer Olympics
Place of birth missing (living people)